Gyraulus piscinarum is a species of gastropods belonging to the family Planorbidae.

The species is found in Southeastern Europe (Bulgaria, Turkey) and Western Asia (Turkey, Syria, Lebanon, Israel, Iran). However, the specific range is uncertain because of uncertainty in assigning specific populations to this species.

References

piscinarum
Gastropods of Asia
Freshwater animals of Asia
Gastropods of Europe
Freshwater animals of Europe
Molluscs described in 1852
Taxa named by Jules René Bourguignat